Ahoskie School is a historic school complex located at Ahoskie, Hertford County, North Carolina. The main school building was designed by architect Leslie Boney and built in 1929. It is a two-story, Classical Revival style brick building. Associated with the school are the contributing one-story brick agricultural building (1937), a one-story brick home economics building (1940), a brick and concrete block gymnasium (1940), an athletic field, and a Department of Transportation highway historical marker commemorating the site of the first 4-H club in North Carolina (1955).

It was listed on the National Register of Historic Places in 2005.

References

School buildings on the National Register of Historic Places in North Carolina
Neoclassical architecture in North Carolina
School buildings completed in 1929
Buildings and structures in Hertford County, North Carolina
National Register of Historic Places in Hertford County, North Carolina
1929 establishments in North Carolina